The Cabeza Prieta Mountains are a mountain range in the northwestern Sonoran Desert of southwest Arizona. It is located in southern Yuma County, Arizona.

The mountain range is amongst an eleven-mountain sequence of north-trending ranges and valleys in the hottest region of the Sonoran Desert. This southwestern Arizona region is on the northern perimeter of the Gran Desierto de Altar. It includes the northern part of the Pinacate volcanic field.

The Cabeza Prieta Mountains extend northwest–southeast about 24 miles. The range is about 36 miles southeast of the Mohawk Valley (Arizona), and Interstate 8 and is in the west-central Barry M. Goldwater Air Force Range. The Cabeza Prieta Mountains comprise the entire western region of the Cabeza Prieta National Wildlife Refuge—about twenty percent of its total area.

See also 
 Cabeza Prieta Wilderness
 Valley and range sequence-Southern Yuma County
 List of mountain ranges of Yuma County, Arizona
 List of mountain ranges of Arizona

References

External links 

 Geology of Cabeza Prieta

Mountain ranges of the Sonoran Desert
Mountain ranges of Yuma County, Arizona
Mountain ranges of Sonora
Mountain ranges of Arizona